Krasnaya Nunatak is a nunatak lying  south of Alderdice Peak in the Nye Mountains of Enderby Land, Antarctica. It was mapped, and named "Gora Krasnaya" (red mountain), by the Soviet Antarctic Expedition, 1961–62.

References

Nunataks of Enderby Land